Landmark Cases in Equity (2012) is a book edited by Charles Mitchell and Paul Mitchell, which outlines the key cases in English trusts law and equity.

Content
The cases discussed are,

The Earl of Oxford's Case (1615) David Ibbetson
Coke v Fountaine (1676) Mike Macnair 
Grey v Grey (1677) Jamie Glister 
Penn v Lord Baltimore (1750) Paul Mitchell 
Burgess v Wheate (1759) Paul Matthews 
Morice v Bishop of Durham (1805) Joshua Getzler 
Tulk v Moxhay (1848) Ben McFarlane 
Prince Albert v Strange (1849) Lionel Bently 
Ramsden v Dyson (1866) Nick Piska 
Bishop of Natal v Gladstone (1866) Charlotte Smith 
Earl of Aylesford v Morris (1873) Catharine MacMillan 
Re Hallett's Estate (1879–80) Graham Virgo
North-West Transportation Co Ltd v Beatty (1887) Lionel Smith 
Rochefoucauld v Boustead (1897) Ying Khai Liew 
Re Earl of Sefton (1898) Chantal Stebbings 
Nocton v Lord Ashburton (1914) James Edelman 
Regal (Hastings) Ltd v Gulliver (1942) Richard Nolan 
National Anti-Vivisection Society v Inland Revenue Commissioners (1948) Jonathan Garton 
National Provincial Bank Ltd v Ainsworth (1965) Alison Dunn 
Boardman v Phipps (1967) Michael Bryan 
Pettitt v Pettitt (1970) and Gissing v Gissing (1971) John Mee 
Paragon Finance plc v DB Thakerar & Co (a firm) (1999) Christian Daly and Charles Mitchell

See also
Landmark case
Restitution in English law
Landmark Cases in the Law of Restitution (2006) by Charles Mitchell and Paul Mitchell
Landmark Cases in the Law of Tort (2010) by Charles Mitchell and Paul Mitchell
Landmark Cases in Family Law (2011) by Stephen Gilmore, Jonathan Herring and Rebecca Probert
Landmark Cases in Contract (2008) by Charles Mitchell and Paul Mitchell 
Landmark Cases in Land Law (2013) by Nigel Gravells

English law
2008 non-fiction books
Law books